Sânmartin is a commune in Cluj County, Transylvania, Romania. It is composed of eight villages: Ceaba (Bálványoscsaba), Cutca (Kötke), Diviciorii Mari (Nagydevecser), Diviciorii Mici (Kisdevecser), Măhal (Mohaly), Sâmboieni (Erdőszombattelke), Sânmartin and Târgușor (Kékesvásárhely).

Demographics 
According to the census from 2002 there was a total population of 1,744 people living in this commune. Of this population, 86.52% are ethnic Romanians, 10.43% are ethnic Hungarians and 3.03% ethnic Romani.

Natives
Emil Giurgiuca

References

Atlasul localităților județului Cluj (Cluj County Localities Atlas), Suncart Publishing House, Cluj-Napoca, 

Communes in Cluj County
Localities in Transylvania